Kim Hyun-tae (Hangul: 김현태; born 1 May 1961) is a South Korean football goalkeeping coach and former footballer.

Honors and awards

Club
Lucky-Goldstar Hwangso
 K League (2): 1985, 1990

Individual
 K-League Best XI (2): 1985, 1986
 K-League Best GK (2): 1985, 1986

External links
 

1961 births
Living people
Association football goalkeepers
South Korean footballers
K League 1 players
FC Seoul players
FC Seoul non-playing staff
Korea University alumni